Sigrgarðs saga frœkna (modern Icelandic Sigurgarðs saga frækna, the saga of Sigrgarðr the Valiant) is a medieval Icelandic romance-saga, described by Finnur Jónsson as 'all in all ... one of the best and most worthy of reading' of the Icelandic 'stepmother-sagas'.

Plot and literary character

The plot of the saga was summarised by Marianne E. Kalinke and P. M. Mitchell:

 Ingigerðr, queen of Taricia, and her two sisters, Hildr and Signý, are suffering from a spell placed on them by Hlégerðr, their father's concubine. No suitor can please Ingigerðr, while Hildr and Signý are turned into animals. When Sigrgarðr, a king's son, woos Ingigerðr, she repeatedly makes a fool of him. He leaves Taricia only to return disguised as a merchant. Ingigerðr outwits him when he attempts to abduct her by means of a flying carpet. Finally Sigrgarðr, posing as the viking Knútr, visits Ingigerðr with two foster-brothers. The three succeed in breaking the spells. The saga concludes with a triple wedding.

Notwithstanding Kalkinke and Mitchell's summary, most manuscripts of the saga set Ingigerðr's kingdom not in 'Taricia' but 'Tartaria' (i.e. Tartary), and it has been argued that the lost original manuscript of the saga must likewise have read Tartaria.

While the saga 'has a lot of rough edges' in its style and plotting, it has nonetheless been characterised as 'tightly and powerfully structured', 'throw[ing] itself with unswerving commitment into a wonder-tale of stepmothers and foster-brothers, curses, flying carpets, deception, disguise, shape-shifting, trolls, and bedroom antics'.

The saga has attracted particular critical commentary because of its handling of gender and sexual politics: it is particularly noteworthy amongst romance-sagas because the moral standing of the main male character is questionable. Before beginning to woo Ingigerðr, Sigrgarðr has previously developed a habit of seducing and discarding women; the degradations which he suffers at her hands can, therefore, be understood as comeuppance for his immorality.

Sources and influences

The saga draws on Viktors saga ok Blávus and Bósa saga ok Herrauðs. More distant similarities with other texts—both medieval ones and later folktales—indicate that the saga draws on oral story-telling traditions, with some details arguably indicating oral links with medieval Irish and Welsh traditions.

Manuscripts and date
The saga is attested in at least 53 manuscripts, dating from the fifteenth century through to the early twentieth, mostly from Iceland, apparently all descended from a lost common original.

The earliest surviving manuscript is Rekjavík, Stofnun Árna Magnússonar, AM 556a-b 4to, from the later fifteenth century, known as Eggertsbók. Peter Jorgensen found that the saga must originally have been composed around 1450×75.

The following list of manuscripts is based on the survey by Kalinke and Mitchell, on Handrit.is, and on the Stories for All Time survey of fornaldarsaga manuscripts. Links to online catalogue entries are provided where available.

Two manuscripts are listed by Kalinke and Mitchell as containing Sigurgarðs saga frækna which actually contain Sigurgarðs saga og Valbrands: Lbs 1496 4to (1883) and Lbs 2319 4to (1727-1729). Likewise, Handrit.is lists Lbs 4547 8vo as containing Sigurgarðs saga frækna, also incorrectly.

Editions and translations
 Einar Þorðarson (ed.), Sagan af Sigurgarði frœkna (Reykjavík: Einar Þorðarson, 1884), http://www.alarichall.org.uk/teaching/sigrgardssaga.php. [A popular reading edition.]
Agnete Loth (ed.), Late Medieval Icelandic Romances, Editiones Arnamagæanae, series B, 20–24, 5 vols Copenhagen: Munksgaard, 1962–65), V 39–107. [The principal scholarly edition.]
 Alaric Hall, Steven D. P. Richardson, and Haukur Þorgeirsson (ed. and trans.), ‘Sigrgarðs saga frækna: A Normalised Text, Translation, and Introduction’, Scandinavian-Canadian Studies/Études Scandinaves au Canada, 21 (2013), 80–155, http://scancan.net/article.htm?id=hall_1_21. [A normalised Old Icelandic text, and English translation, based on Loth's edition.]

References

Chivalric sagas
Icelandic literature
Old Norse literature